Doumea gracila is a species of catfish in the genus Doumea. It lives from Nyong to the Ntem rivers in southern Cameroon.

References 

Amphiliidae
Freshwater fish of Africa
Fish described in 2007